Phosphotransferases are a category of enzymes (EC number 2.7) that catalyze phosphorylation reactions. The general form of the reactions they catalyze is:
A-P + B  B-P + A

Where P is a phosphate group and A and B are the donating and accepting molecules, respectively.

Classification
Phosphotransferases are generally classified according to the acceptor molecule.
EC 2.7.1 Phosphotransferases with an alcohol group as acceptor
EC 2.7.2 Phosphotransferases with a carboxy group as acceptor
EC 2.7.3 Phosphotransferases with a nitrogenous group as acceptor
EC 2.7.4 Phosphotransferases with a phosphate group as acceptor
EC 2.7.9 Phosphotransferases with paired acceptors. In these reactions, a single triphosphate-nucleotide transfers two phosphates to two different acceptor molecules, resulting in a monophosphate-nucleotide and two phosphorylated products.

Phosphotransferase system
The phosphotransferase system (PTS) is a complex group translocation system present in many bacteria. The PTS transports sugars (such as glucose, mannose, and mannitol) into the cell. The first step of this reaction is phosphorylation of the substrate via phosphotransferase during transport. In the case of glucose, the product of this phosphorylation is glucose-6-phosphate (Glc-6P).
Due to the negative charge of the phosphate, this Glc-6P can no longer freely leave the cell. This is the first reaction of glycolysis, which degrades the sugar to pyruvate.

See also
 Kinase
 Phosphorylase
 Diphosphotransferase

References

External links
 

Transferases
EC 2.7